Anjialava is a rural municipality in northern Madagascar. It belongs to the district of Sambava, which is a part of Sava Region. The population of the commune was estimated to be approximately 9,000 in 2001 commune census.

Only primary schooling is available in town. The majority 99.99% of the population in the commune are farmers.  The most important crops are rice and vanilla, while other important agricultural products are coffee and beans.  Services provide employment for 0.01% of the population.

Geography
This village is situated north of Sambava on the banks of the Bemarivo River.

References 

Populated places in Sava Region